Alexeyevka is a rural locality (a village) in Kletnyansky District, Bryansk Oblast, Russia. The population was 245 as of 2013. There are 4 streets.

References 

Rural localities in Kletnyansky District